Okraj (el. ) is a mountain pass in Poland and the Czech Republic, on the eastern end of Karkonosze, separating two side ranges of the mountains. Former checkpoint, dismounted in 2007 after the implementation of the Schengen Agreement.

There are Polish and Czech mountain huts as well as some hotels and restaurants on the Czech side, belonging to the village of Malá Úpa. The pass is accessible with the tarmac road from both sides. The road, connecting Jelenia Góra and Trutnov was built by Germans in 1937; the next year it was used to invade Czechoslovakia. Hiking and mountain bike trails connect this place to towns and villages in valleys; bus connection also is available.

See also
 List of highest paved roads in Europe
 List of mountain passes

References 

Mountain passes of Poland
Mountain passes of the Czech Republic
Sudetes
Czech Republic–Poland border crossings